Guarea guentheri is a species of plant in the family Meliaceae. It is found in Brazil and Peru. It is threatened by habitat loss.

References

guentheri
Vulnerable plants
Taxonomy articles created by Polbot